Harpalus brachypterus is a species of ground beetle in the subfamily Harpalinae. It was described by Tschitcherine in 1898.

References

brachypterus
Beetles described in 1898